Dmytro Ruslanovych Romanov (born 25 July 2002) is a Ukrainian professional footballer who plays as a right midfielder for Ukrainian Second League club Real Pharma Odesa on loan from Chornomorets Odesa.

References

External links
 
 

2002 births
Living people
Ukrainian footballers
Association football midfielders
FC Chornomorets Odesa players
FC Real Pharma Odesa players
Ukrainian Second League players